This is a list of years in Hashemite Kingdom of Iraq.

See also
List of years in Iraq
List of years by country
Timeline of Baghdad
Timeline of Basra
Timeline of Mosul

 
year